The 2013 Omloop Het Nieuwsblad – Women's race took place on 23 February 2013. It was the 8th women's edition of the Omloop Het Nieuwsblad. This year's Omloop started and ended  in Ghent, Belgium and spanned  in the province of East Flanders.

The race was won by Australian rider Tiffany Cromwell who won a side-by-side sprint of Megan Guarnier. Emma Johansson won the sprint of the group behind the two and finished third.

Results

References

Omloop Het Nieuwsblad – Women's race
Omloop Het Nieuwsblad
Omloop Het Nieuwsblad